The Sacred Heart of Jesus Church is in Fontana, Gozo Island, part of the Maltese Archipelago. It is the parish church of Fontana, one of the smallest villages on the island.

History
The foundation stone was laid on 29 January 1893. The church was dedicated to the Sacred Heart of Jesus on 29 January 1905 by Bishop Giovanni Maria Camilleri. The main altarpiece, showing the Most Sacred Heart of Jesus, was crowned with a golden crown on 18 June 1993, by  Bishop Nicholas J. Cauchi, on the occasion of the first centenary of the laying of the church's foundation stone. The main altarpiece is part of Giuseppe Calì's works.

The Fontana parish was established March 27, 1911 by Bishop Giovanni Maria Camilleri.

The church building is listed on the National Inventory of the Cultural Property of the Maltese Islands.

See also 

Culture of Malta
History of Malta
List of Churches in Malta
Religion in Malta

References

External links 
 Official parish website
 Fontana local council

1893 establishments in Malta
Roman Catholic churches in Malta
Fontana, Gozo
Baroque church buildings in Malta
National Inventory of the Cultural Property of the Maltese Islands